Gustav Mevissen, after 1884 known as Gustav von Mevissen, (20 May 1815 – 13 August 1899), was a German businessman and politician.

Mevissen was born in Dülken, Rhine Province. He started by investing in textile industry and later in railway construction and heavy industry. He founded numerous banks, including the Darmstädter Bank, and insurance companies. He is considered a pioneer of the German credit and insurance industry.

As a politician he was a leading representative of Rhineland liberalism and he was a member of the Provincial Assembly of the Rhine Province, the Vereinigter Landtag, the Frankfurt Parliament. From 1866 he was a member of the Prussian House of Lords. He died in Bad Godesberg.

1815 births
1899 deaths
Members of the Frankfurt Parliament
Members of the Prussian House of Lords
Businesspeople from North Rhine-Westphalia